Mordella palembanga is a species of beetle in the genus Mordella of the family Mordellidae, which is part of the superfamily Tenebrionoidea. It was discovered in 1941 in Sumatra, Indonesia.

References

Beetles described in 1941
palembanga